The Hôtel de Chevreuse (later Hôtel d'Épernon, then Hôtel de Longueville) was an aristocratic townhouse (hôtel particulier), built in 1622 and located on the west side of the  on a site now part of the Cour Napoléon on the west side of the Louvre in Paris, France. The hôtel was destroyed in 1834.

Ownership history
An earlier hôtel on the site was sold in 1620 for 175,000 livres to Charles d'Albert, Duke of Luynes, who the following year united it with an adjacent house to the west for 8,000 écus. After Luynes died in December 1621, the property passed to his widow, Marie de Rohan.

The old hôtel was demolished and the Hôtel de Chevreuse was built in 1622–1623 to the designs of the architect Clément Métezeau for Marie de Rohan's new husband, Claude of Lorraine, Duke of Chevreuse, who had purchased the property from her just before their marriage on 21 April 1622. After his death in 1657, she sold it for 400,000 livres to the Duke of Candale, who put it in the name of his father Bernard de Nogaret, Duc d'Épernon.

The Duke of Épernon died on 25 July 1661, and on 30 July 1662, Marie-Claire de Bauffrement, widow of Gaston de Foix, Comte de Fleix, relinquished it to Louis XIV for 488,722 livres, 8 sous, 9 deniers. On 13 August, Louis gave it to Duke Henri II de Longueville, in exchange for the hôtel the latter had in the Rue des Poulies. The Duke of Longueville died the following year, and his daughter, Marie d'Orléans de Longueville, having inherited all of his estates following the deaths of her brothers, gave it to her cousin,  (known under the name of Prince of Neufchâtel), who died in 1703.  On 30 July 1710, his daughter, brought it as part of her dowry to Charles Philippe d'Albert, Duke of Luynes, to whose family the property thus returned.

On old maps of Paris
The hôtel is depicted on the 1652 Gomboust map of Paris with an entrance screen and a central porte cochère on the rue Saint-Thomas-du Louvre, a cour d'honneur with two lateral wings and a corps de logis between the entrance court and a large garden, which runs all the way to the rue Saint-Niçaise on the west. It is also shown in a somewhat different configuration on the Turgot map of Paris, published in 1739.

Depictions by Jean Marot
The street and garden façades of the hôtel were engraved by Jean Marot. The two engravings were re-engraved and published in 1655 in volume one of Martin Zeiller's Topographia Galliae. A view of the street front from a higher perspectivew with a cutout of the entrance screen was engraved by Marot c. 1670.

See also
 Hôtel de Rambouillet, located immediately to the north of the Hôtel de Chevreuse

Notes

Bibliography
Berty, Adolphe (1885). "Hôtel d'O, de la Vieuville, de Chevreuse, d'Épernon, et de Longueville", pp. 103–105, in Topographie historique du vieux Paris: Région du Louvre et des Tuileries, second edition, vol. 1. Paris: Imprimerie Nationale.
 Deutsch, Kristina (2015). Jean Marot : Un graveur d'architecture à l'époque de Louis XIV. Berlin: De Gruyter. .
 Gady, Alexandre (2008). Les Hôtels particuliers de Paris du Moyen Âge à la Belle Époque. Paris: Parigramme. .

Chevreuse Louvre
Buildings and structures in the 2nd arrondissement of Paris
Houses completed in 1623
Ancien Régime French architecture
Demolished buildings and structures in Paris
Former buildings and structures in Paris
1623 establishments in France
Buildings and structures demolished in 1834